Kosmopolan (English: The Cosmopolitan) is a defunct Volapük and English quarterly gazette issued between 1891 and 1897.
Volapük
Magazines established in 1891
Magazines disestablished in 1897
English-language magazines